Peter John Young (31 July 1954—5 September 1981) was a British astrophysicist, who made major contributions in theory and observation to extragalactic astronomy and cosmology. During five years at the California Institute of Technology in 1976-1981 he carried out foundational research, including the discovery of the intergalactic medium; the detection of a supermassive black hole in the galaxy M87; detecting the optical counterpart to the first gravitational lens; developing the theory of gravitational microlensing.

Early life and education
Educated at Leeds Grammar School, Young studied mathematics at St John's College, Cambridge (1972-1975), where he was Senior Wrangler (highest-placed First Class degree) in 1975. In 1975-76, he studied for an MSc in astronomy with Gerard de Vaucouleurs at the University of Texas, Austin. In 1976, he began his PhD at the California Institute of Technology, under the supervision of Wallace Sargent. He completed this degree in 18 months, was employed for a further year as a postdoctoral researcher, and then joined the Caltech faculty as an Assistant Professor in 1979, aged 25.

Scientific achievements
Young was a versatile scientist, bringing powerful theoretical insights to observational projects - both those of his own devising and those led by his PhD supervisor, Wallace Sargent. They were able to make effective use of the large amounts of time available to Caltech researchers on the Mt Palomar 200-inch Hale telescope, with its power being enhanced via collaboration with Alexander Boksenberg and his Image Photon Counting Spectrograph. The IPCS was the first photon-counting device used in astronomy; although displaced by the more efficient Charge-Coupled Devices, it had some advantages over them in possessing zero read noise. This combination of factors generated transformational developments in the following areas of astronomy:

In 1978, Young et al. and Sargent et al. provided evidence from photometry and spectroscopy for a supermassive Black Hole in the nucleus of the elliptical galaxy M87. This object was latterly revealed via direct high-resolution imaging by the Event Horizon Telescope.

In 1980, Sargent, Young, Boksenberg & Tytler studied the Lyman-alpha forest in the rest-frame ultraviolet portion of quasar spectra, concluding that it arose from absorption by a cosmological distribution of partly ionized neutral Hydrogen, and establishing the existence of the intergalactic medium.

In 1980, Young et al. identified the galaxy responsible for the first gravitational lens, the Double Quasar  Q0957+561. This paper produced the first detailed mass models for a cosmological lensing event.

In 1981, Young realised that the multiple images in Q0957+561 would be affected by the gravitational fields of a large number of stars in the lensing galaxy, leading to rapid fluctuations in the magnification of the quasar images. His theoretical study of these superimposed gravitational deflections helped initiate the subject of gravitational microlensing.

By the time of his death, Young had written 33 papers during his five years at Caltech, many of which had a major influence on the development of astronomical research.

Death
On 5 September 1981, Young committed suicide by taking potassium cyanide which he had obtained from a chemistry stockroom at the university. According to Sargent and Peter Goldreich, Young had suffered with depression and psychological issues since his time at Cambridge, and had previously talked about killing himself.

References

1954 births
1981 deaths
British cosmologists
British astrophysicists
Alumni of St John's College, Cambridge
University of Texas at Austin alumni
California Institute of Technology alumni
California Institute of Technology faculty
Date of birth missing
British expatriate academics in the United States
1981 suicides
Suicides by cyanide poisoning
Suicides in California